Munxar Falcons F.C. is a Maltese football club from the village of Munxar, Gozo, Malta. They were founded in 1972 and they are currently playing in the Gozo Football League Second Division.

Honours

References

External links 
 

Football clubs in Malta
Gozitan football clubs
Association football clubs established in 1972
1972 establishments in Malta
Munxar